William Franklin Hardman Jr. (April 6, 1933 – December 6, 1990) was an American jazz trumpeter and flugelhornist who chiefly played hard bop. He was married to Roseline and they had a daughter Nadege.

Career 
Hardman was born and grew up in Cleveland, Ohio, and worked with local players including Bobby Few and Bob Cunningham; while in high school he appeared with Tadd Dameron, and after graduation he joined Tiny Bradshaw's band. Hardman's first recording was with Jackie McLean in 1956; he later played with Charles Mingus, Art Blakey and the Jazz Messengers, Horace Silver, and Lou Donaldson, and led a group with Junior Cook. Hardman also recorded as a leader: Saying Something on the Savoy label received critical acclaim in jazz circles, but was little known to the general public. He had three periods in as many decades with Art Blakey's Jazz Messengers; Hardman's misfortune was not to be with the Messengers at the time of their popular Blue Note recordings. Blakey occasionally featured him playing several extended choruses unaccompanied.

He died in Paris, France, of a brain hemorrhage at the age of 57.

Playing style and legacy 
A crackling hard bop player with blazing technique, crisp articulations, and a no-frills sound, Hardman later incorporated into his sound the fuller, more extroverted romantic passion of a Clifford Brown – a direction he would take increasingly throughout the late-1960s and 1970s. He figures by and large among the top ranks of hardbop titans of the time, although he never managed a commercial breakthrough like many of his colleagues such as Donald Byrd, Freddie Hubbard and Lee Morgan.

Discography

As leader 
 1961Saying Something (Savoy)
 1978Home (Muse)
 1980Focus (Muse)
 1981Politely (Muse)
 1989What's Up (SteepleChase)
With Brass Company
 1975Colors (Strata-East)

As sideman 
With Dave Bailey
 2 Feet in the Gutter (Epic, 1961)
With Art Blakey
 Hard Bop (Columbia, 1956)
 Originally (Columbia, 1956 [1982])
 Drum Suite (Columbia, 1957)
 Selections from Lerner and Loewe's... (Vik, 1957)
 Tough! (Cadet, 1957 [1966])
A Night in Tunisia (Vik, 1957)
Cu-Bop (Jubilee, 1957)
Ritual: The Modern Jazz Messengers (Pacific Jazz 1957)
A Midnight Session with the Jazz Messengers (Elektra, 1957)
 Art Blakey's Jazz Messengers With Thelonious Monk (Atlantic, 1957)
 Hard Drive (Bethlehem, 1957)
Art Blakey Big Band (Bethlehem, 1957)
Art Blakey and the Jazz Messengers (Live at Slug's (1968) (Everest 1977)
Art Blakey and the Jazz Messengers (Moanin' Live (1968)  (Laserlight CD)
Jazz Messengers '70 (Catalyst, 1970)
In Walked Sonny Jazz Messengers with Sonny Stitt  (Sonnet 1975)
Backgammon (Roulette, 1976)
With Walter Bishop Jr
 Hot House (Muse, 1977/78 [1979])
With Junior Cook
Good Cookin' (Muse, 1979)
With Lou Donaldson
 Sunny Side Up (Blue Note, 1960)
 Possum Head (Argo, 1964)
 Musty Rusty (Cadet, 1965)
 Fried Buzzard (Cadet, 1965)
With Charles Earland
Infant Eyes (Muse, 1979)
Pleasant Afternoon (Muse, 1981)
With Curtis Fuller
 Crankin' (Mainstream, 1971)
 Smokin' (Mainstream, 1972)
With Benny Golson
 Pop + Jazz = Swing (Audio Fidelity, 1961) – also released as Just Jazz!
With Eddie Jefferson
 Come Along with Me (Prestige, 1969)
With Ronnie Mathews
Legacy (Bee Hive, 1979)
With Jackie McLean
 Jackie's Pal (Prestige, 1956)
 McLean's Scene (New Jazz, 1956)
 Jackie McLean & Co. (Prestige, 1957)
With Jimmy McGriff
Movin' Upside the Blues (JAM, 1982)
With Charles Mingus
 A Modern Jazz Symposium of Music and Poetry (Bethlehem, 1957)
With Hank Mobley
 Hank Mobley (album) (Blue Note, 1957)
With Houston Person
Wild Flower (Muse, 1977)
With Mickey Tucker
Sojourn (Xanadu, 1977)
With Steve Turre
 Viewpoints and Vibrations (Stash, 1987)
With Mal Waldron
 Mal 2 (Prestige, 1957) – with John Coltrane
With Reuben Wilson
 The Sweet Life (Groove Merchant, 1973)

References 

American jazz trumpeters
American male trumpeters
Hard bop trumpeters
1933 births
1990 deaths
American jazz flugelhornists
The Jazz Messengers members
Muse Records artists
Savoy Records artists
SteepleChase Records artists
Strata-East Records artists
Musicians from Cleveland
20th-century American musicians
American male jazz musicians
20th-century American male musicians